Maria Barbara Kamrowska-Nowak (born 11 March 1966 in Starogard Gdański) is a retired Polish heptathlete.

She finished ninth at the 1991 World Championships, won the bronze medal at the 1991 Summer Universiade and finished seventh at the 1994 European Indoor Championships.

She competed in 100 metres hurdles at the 1993 World Championships without advancing to the final round.

References

External links

1966 births
Living people
Polish heptathletes
Athletes (track and field) at the 1992 Summer Olympics
Olympic athletes of Poland
People from Starogard Gdański
Sportspeople from Pomeranian Voivodeship
Universiade medalists in athletics (track and field)
Skra Warszawa athletes
Universiade bronze medalists for Poland
Medalists at the 1991 Summer Universiade
20th-century Polish women
21st-century Polish women